The Women's Javelin Throw at the 2009 World Championships in Athletics will be held at the Olympic Stadium on August 16 and August 18. The event featured four athletes whose ability was so much better than the opposition that Mirko Jalava of the IAAF said it would be a "major surprise" should another athlete beat them to the podium.

The Olympic champion and world record holder Barbora Špotáková, and Beijing silver medallist Mariya Abakumova, had not matched their Olympic form of the previous year but remained strong contenders for the competition. The other two athletes came from the German team, which was headed by world-leader and two-time World medallist Christina Obergföll, as well as the veteran Steffi Nerius who won silver in 2003, 2005 and 2007. Osleidys Menéndez, Sunette Viljoen and Madara Palameika were the outside contenders.

A modest qualifying round was highlighted by Abakumova's world-leading throw of 68.92 m, while German number three Linda Stahl and Slovenian Martina Ratej threw season's bests to qualify as the second and third best throwers. The first round saw the elimination of two of the season's top-six athletes, Palameika and Viljoen. On the final day, Nerius opened the competition in style with a season's best 67.30 m on her first throw, while Špotáková and Monica Stoian completed the top three with 64.94 and 	64.51 m respectively. With a throw of 65.39 m Mariya Abakumova moved into the bronze medal position, and she would remain there for the rest of the event. Obergföll and Stahl moved into the top six in round three, but the positions remained static thereafter. Neither Špotáková nor Abakumova (whose qualifying throw would have won the final) could find the form to dislodge Nerius from the gold medal spot. The 37-year-old German won her first ever World Championship gold medal in Berlin, in what was her final year in competitive athletics.

Medalists

Schedule
All times are Central European Time (UTC+1)

Qualification standards

Records

Results

Qualification
Qualification: Qualifying distance 62.00 (Q) or the least 12 best athletes and ties (q) advance to the final.

Key:  Q = qualification by place in heat, q = qualification by overall place, SB = Seasonal best, WL = World leading (in a given season)

Final

Key:  PB = Personal best, SB = Seasonal best

References
General
Javelin throw results (Archived 2009-09-08). IAAF. Retrieved on 2009-08-16.
Specific

Javelin throw
Javelin throw at the World Athletics Championships
2009 in women's athletics